The Call of the Canyon is a 1924 novel by Zane Grey.

Plot introduction
It is the story of Glenn Kilbourne, a US Army veteran, who returns from the battlefields of World War I "shell-shocked and gassed", and otherwise incapacitated".  It is set in the American West of the Roaring Twenties.

External links

1924 American novels
Novels by Zane Grey
Novels set in the Roaring Twenties